Andrea Feldman (April 1, 1948 – August 8, 1972) was an American actress and Warhol superstar. She committed suicide in 1972.

Career
Andrea Feldman was a native New Yorker. She attended Quintano's School for Young Professionals, a high school for the performing arts. She starred in three Warhol films; Imitation of Christ, Trash and Heat.
A regular in the back room of Max's Kansas City, she pioneered a performance which she called "Showtime", in which she performed a striptease on the round table, at the center of the room. She became known for her dependence on drugs, particularly amphetamines.

Feldman was featured in a 1970 documentary called Groupies, where she referred to herself by a nickname given to her by the Warhol crowd; Andrea "Whips" Feldman. She also often referred to herself as "Andrea Warhol". She was known by her friends as "Crazy Andy".

"A lot of people in the Warhol scene pretended to be crazy, but Andrea really was. She had endless money for everything but mental health. When she had nervous breakdowns, her parents would send her to state hospitals. Just before Heat came out and she knew—she was about to be a star, she had a nervous breakdown, and her physician told her parents that what she needed was a job. I remember her saying "What am I supposed to do? Be a waitress?!" - Penny Arcade.

Death
In August 1972, several days after returning from Europe, Feldman summoned several ex-boyfriends, including poet Jim Carroll, to the New York City apartment of her parents to witness what she called her "final starring role". "She left a note that said, "I'm headed for the big time. I'm on my way up there with James Dean and Marilyn Monroe"".

"Andrea and I were engaged at the time and we were going to get married. It was sort of a ploy at first but it started to get serious. Her parents would commit her to Bellevue now and then to keep her under their thumb. Things seemed a little strange between us when I got back from doing Pork, a play we were performing in England. It was real wild for a while there, and Andrea was acting very strange toward me, like she didn't trust me. All of a sudden in the middle of all the mayhem, Andrea stood up on a chair and held a picture of Marilyn Monroe over her head, and she just stood there. And a couple of people at other tables said, "Oh, it's Showtime!" After a long time of just standing there, she said, "Marilyn died; love me while you can!" The next day, she jumped from the fourteenth-floor window of her uncle's apartment" - Leee Black Childers.

Andrea jumped to her death on August 8, 1972, a few days after the tenth anniversary of Marilyn Monroe's death. Geraldine Smith, who had appeared in Flesh and was a close friend of Andrea, wrote in her obituary for The Village Voice.

"Andrea Feldman, one of Andy Warhol's superstars, jumped to her death on August 8 at 4:30 pm from a 14th floor window at 51 Fifth Avenue, taking with her a crucifix and Bible she found in a church a few days before... Andrea left a note addressed to everyone she knew, saying she loved us all, but 'I'm going for the big time, I hit the jackpot!"

Rumours spread that the note that Andrea left behind wasn't as kind as Smith's obituary implied.

"Andrea had apparently made dates for that afternoon with half a dozen guys she had gone out with, including the poet and diarist Jim Carroll, so that they would all be down on the sidewalk when she flew out the window... In the back room of Max's the old Superstars were saying that Geraldine had been kind in print - the note wasn't to everyone and it wasn't about love; it was to Andy and it was very, very nasty." - Bob Colacello.

Her suicide preceded the release of Warhol's Heat, in which she had a much larger role than in previous Warhol films. Feldman's performance garnered positive reviews. Judith Crist, a critic for New York magazine wrote: "The most striking performance, in large part non-performance, comes from the late Andrea Feldman, as the flat-voiced, freaked-out daughter, a mass of psychotic confusion, infantile and heart-breaking."

Filmography
Imitation of Christ (1967) - Son's girlfriend
**** (Four Stars) aka 24 Hour Movie (1967)
Groupies (1970, documentary) - Herself 
Trash (1970) - Rich Girl
Heat (1972) - Jessica Todd

References

External links
 

1948 births
1972 suicides
20th-century American actresses
Actresses from New York City
American film actresses
Suicides by jumping in New York City
People associated with The Factory
1972 deaths